Scione is a genus of flies in the family Tabanidae.

Species
Scione ablusus Fairchild, 1964
Scione acer Philip, 1958
Scione albifasciata (Macquart, 1846)
Scione albohirta Kröber, 1930
Scione albopilosus Burger, 2002
Scione aurulans (Wiedemann, 1830)
Scione bilineata Philip, 1968
Scione brevibeccus Wilkerson, 1979
Scione brevistriga Enderlein, 1925
Scione cingulata (Enderlein, 1925)
Scione claripennis Ricardo, 1900
Scione costaricana Szilády, 1926
Scione crassa Szilády, 1926
Scione cupreus Wilkerson, 1979
Scione distincta (Schiner, 1868)
Scione equatoriensis Surcouf, 1919
Scione equivexans Wilkerson, 1979
Scione flavescens (Enderlein, 1930)
Scione flavohirta Ricardo, 1902
Scione fulva Ricardo, 1902
Scione fumipennis Kröber, 1930
Scione fusca Ricardo, 1900
Scione grandis Philip, 1943
Scione huancabambae Kröber, 1930
Scione immaculata (Kröber, 1930)
Scione incompleta (Macquart, 1846)
Scione limbativena Enderlein, 1925
Scione longirostris Brèthes, 1920
Scione maculipennis (Schiner, 1868)
Scione minor (Macquart, 1847)
Scione minuta Szilády, 1926
Scione nigripes (Kröber, 1930)
Scione obscurefemorata Kröber, 1930
Scione picta Szilády, 1926
Scione punctata Szilády, 1926
Scione rhinothrix Wilkerson, 1979
Scione rufescens (Ricardo, 1900)
Scione rufipes (Kröber, 1930)
Scione serratus Wilkerson, 1979
Scione strigata (Enderlein, 1925)
Scione youngi Wilkerson, 1979

References

Tabanidae
Brachycera genera
Diptera of South America
Taxa named by Francis Walker (entomologist)